Disney Channel Play It Loud is an album from Disney released on February 11, 2014.

Composition and release 
The album features musical artists associated with or popularized by Disney Channel such as Ross Lynch, Debby Ryan, Zendaya, China Anne McClain, Dove Cameron, Laura Marano, Bella Thorne, and Luke Benward. Some songs were recorded prior to the production of this album, while others were recorded specifically for it. Disney Channel Play It Loud was released on February 11, 2014. The Brazilian Edition includes one exclusive bonus track, "Livin' Out Loud", performed by College 11, and the album has a different cover. The UK Edition includes eight exclusive bonus tracks, Cruisin' for a Bruisin' and Falling for Ya from Teen Beach Movie, In My Own World from Violetta, Take on the World from Girl Meets World, Count Me In from Liv & Maddie, It's My Friday, The Disney Channel UK theme song and Too Much from Zapped.

Track listing

Charts

Release history

References 

2014 compilation albums
Pop compilation albums
Walt Disney Records compilation albums
Disney Channel albums